Visitors to Zimbabwe must obtain a visa from one of the Zimbabwean diplomatic missions or online unless they come from one of the visa exempt countries or are eligible for visa on arrival. As of November 2014 Zimbabwe and Zambia also offer a universal tourist visa.

Visa policy map

Visa exemption 
Citizens of the following 41(+4) countries and territories can visit Zimbabwe without a visa for up to 3 months, unless otherwise specified.

Holders of diplomatic or service passports of any country do not require a visa.

In early 2018 it was announced that Zimbabwe plans to significantly expand its visa-free regime.

Visa on arrival

Citizens of the following 102(+2) countries and territories can obtain a visa on arrival:

The visa is valid for either 30 days (for visits on business) or 3 months (for touristic visits).

eVisa

Foreign citizens may apply for all types of visa (tourism, business, residence and study) online through the eVisa system of the Zimbabwe Department of Immigration. Visa fee can be paid online or on arrival. It takes an average of two working days to obtain an e-Visa. However the period may vary due to a number of factors. The e-Visa is valid for three months from the date of issue.

It may be used to enter at one of the following crossings:

Beitbridge
Harare International Airport
Chirundu
Plumtree
Forbes - Mutare
Nyamapanda
Kariba
Victoria Falls
Joshua Mqabuko Nkomo International Airport

Universal visa

Zimbabwe and Zambia introduced a universal visa on 28 November 2014 called KAZA Visa. This visa can be obtained on arrival and is valid for both countries for visits up to 30 days while remaining within Zambia and Zimbabwe (including day trips to Chobe National Park in Botswana at Kazungula). In second phase Namibia, Angola and Botswana are expected to join the project. In third stage three SADC pilot countries are expected to join and in fourth stage all SADC countries are expected to become part of the universal visa project.

The universal visa project was suspended in 2015 due to running out of visa stickers and the expiry of the Memorandum of Understanding between the two countries. The new Memorandum was signed in December 2016, extending the list of eligible countries (including territories) from 40 to 65. In Zimbabwe it is issued at Kazungula, Victoria Falls, Zimbabwe, Harare International Airport and Victoria Falls Airport border crossings.

Eligible countries are:

Transit
Nationals of Bangladesh and Pakistan require a visa at all times, including for transit. Nationals of all other countries may transit through any International Airports of Zimbabwe up to 6 hours on the same calendar day.

See also

 Visa requirements for Zimbabwean citizens

References 

Zimbabwe
Foreign relations of Zimbabwe